Pipeline may refer to:

Electronics, computers and computing
 Pipeline (computing), a chain of data-processing stages or a CPU optimization found on 
 Instruction pipelining, a technique for implementing instruction-level parallelism within a single processor
 Classic RISC pipeline, a five-stage hardware based computer instruction set
 Pipeline (software), a chain of data-processing processes or other software entities
 Pipeline (Unix), a set of process chained by their standard streams
 XML pipeline, a connection of XML transformations
 CMS Pipelines, an improvement on UNIX piping.  Allows multiple streams, moves pointers rather than data, is predictable.  
 Graphics pipeline, the method of rasterization-based rendering as supported by graphics hardware
 Pipelining (DSP implementation), a transformation for optimizing digital circuit
 Telestream pipeline, a video capture and playout hardware device

Physical infrastructure
 Pipeline transport, a conduit made from pipes connected end-to-end for long-distance fluid or gas transport
 Plastic pipework, for fluid handling
 Milking pipeline, used on a dairy farm to transport fluid milk

Business
 Art pipeline, process of creating and implementing art for a particular project, most commonly associated with the creative process for developing video games. 
 Sales pipeline, a visualisation of the sales process of a company

Places
 Banzai Pipeline, a surfing spot on the North Shore of Oahu
 Mister Pipeline, an Oahu surfer title
 Pipeline, Nairobi, a residential neighbourhood in Nairobi
 Tolt Pipeline Trail, an equestrian and biking trail in Redmond, Washington, USA and Canada
 Keystone Pipeline, a partially operational and proposed pipeline from Canada to the Gulf of Mexico
 Trans-Alaska Pipeline System, a pipeline transporting crude oil across Alaska from the Prudhoe Bay oil fields

In arts and entertainment

Games
 Pipeline (game), a 1988 computer game for the BBC Micro and Acorn Electron
 Pipeline (board game), winner of Games Magazine's 1992 Game of the Year award

Literature
 Pipeline (comics), a character from Marvel Comics with the ability to teleport himself and others
 Pipeline, a 2017 play written by Dominique Morisseau

Music 
 Pipeline (instrumental), a 1963 song by the Chantays
 Pipeline Music, a record label
 "Pipeline", a 1983 song by Depeche Mode from the album Construction Time Again
 "Pipeline", a 1984 song by the Alan Parsons Project from the album Ammonia Avenue
 BBC Radio Scotland, a programme of music on the bagpipes

Other uses in arts and entertainment
 Pipeline (film), a 2021 South Korean heist film
 CNN Pipeline, a streaming video service by CNN

Roller coasters 

 Pipeline roller coaster, a roller coaster model
 Pipeline: The Surf Coaster, a roller coaster at SeaWorld Orlando in Orlando, Florida

Other uses
 The Pipeline, a former internet service provider
 School-to-prison pipeline, a pattern in the U.S., described by scholars and reform activists, of pushing disadvantaged students out of school and into the criminal justice system
 Drug pipeline, the drugs a pharmaceutical company has in development

See also
 Pipe (disambiguation)